The Avioane Craiova IAR-93 Vultur (Eagle) is a twinjet, subsonic, close support, ground attack and tactical reconnaissance aircraft with secondary capability as low level interceptor. Built as single-seat main attack version or combat capable two-seat version for advanced flying and weapon training, it was developed as a joint Yugoslav-Romanian project in the 1970s for the air forces of both nations. The Romanian aircraft were built by I.R.Av. Craiova as IAR-93, and its Yugoslav counterpart by Soko as the Soko J-22 Orao. For Romania, the IAR-93 was intended to replace MiG-15s and MiG-17s in the fighter-bomber role.

Development
On May 20, 1971, Romania and Yugoslavia signed the governmental agreements for the YuRom R&D programme. The program managers were Dipl. Dr. Engineer Teodor Zamfirescu for the Romanian party and Colonel Vidoje Knežević for the Yugoslav party.

The requirements called for a light subsonic aircraft for ground attack and tactical reconnaissance missions and with low level air combat as a secondary capability. It was to be built on a simple structure, using locally produced equipment and avionics (but compatible with Western components), tough (able to operate on grass or damaged runways), easy to maintain, and reliable. The aircraft was of conventional twin-engine, high mounted wing monoplane configuration with all flying surfaces swept. The Rolls-Royce Viper was chosen as the powerplant, as SOKO had experience with licence-building this engine. It was originally intended that an afterburner would be developed for the Viper engines, but there were prolonged difficulties with this project, meaning that none of the pre-production aircraft featured it, and neither did early production examples. During the 1980s, both countries developed slightly different versions to take advantage of the afterburning engines that had since become available.

Flight testing
The Romanian single-seat prototype White 001 made its first flight which lasted 21 minutes on October 31, 1974 at Bacău (simultaneously with the Yugoslav prototype at Batajnica Air Base). The aircraft was flown by Colonel Gheorghe Stănică. On September 20, 1979 the plane was lost when, during a test flight both engines stopped and the pilot ejected. This prompted modifications to the combustion chamber (including all aircraft already delivered).

On July 18, 1975 the aircraft was presented to Nicolae Ceauşescu on the Bacău airfield.

The DC (two-seat) prototype #003 first flew on January 23, 1977, and was lost on November 24, 1977 due to tail flutter. The left elevator broke off while in level flight at 500 m altitude and 1,045 km/h. The Martin-Baker Mk RU10J zero-zero ejection seats functioned well and the two test pilots ejected safely. After this event the aft fuselage structure was reinforced.

Prototype #004 crashed at Craiova Air Base on February 20, 1979 during an aerobatics demonstration. The pilot, Capt. Eng. Dobre Stan didn't manage to eject.

On August 23, 1979 three IAR-93 (#001, #002 and #005) were first presented to the public in flight during the military parade celebrating the national day of Romania at that time.

Variants

 IAR-93A: initial production version with non-afterburning Viper Mk 632-41 turbojets15 pre-production aircraft delivered in 1979; entered service in 198126 built (#109-119 pre-production, #150-164 series) as single-seaters and 9 DC (two-seat) trainers (#005-008 pre-production, #180-184 series)
 IAR-93MB: MB = Motor de Baza (basic engine). This version had the fuselage of the IAR-93B but used the non-afterburning engine of the IAR-93Adelivered starting with 198215 single-seaters built (#201-215)
 IAR-93B: refined version with afterburning Viper Mk 633-47 engines, increased internal fuel capacity, upgraded hardpoints and revised wing, including leading edge extensions. Also, the ventral fins, inboard wing fences and forward fuselage strakes were removedfirst flew in 1985; entered service in 198727 built as single-seater (#200, #216-241) and 7 DC (#600-606)

Operators
 Romania
 Romanian Air Force (67th Fighter-Bomber Regiment and 49th Fighter-Bomber Regiment from Craiova and Ianca respectively)

Lost aircraft
Data from Romanian press and partially from ejection-history.org.uk
 #003, November 24, 1977 The left elevator broke off due to flutter. Both pilots, Col. Gheorghe D. Stanica and Col. Petru Ailiesei, ejected safely.
 #004, February 20, 1979 at Craiova Air Base. Crashed during an aerobatics demonstration. Capt. Eng. Dobre Stan, didn't manage to eject.
 #001, September 20, 1979 Both engines stopped. Col. Ilie P. Botea ejected safely.
 #113, March 8, 1983 Maj. Crashed on landing due to pilot error. Maj Ion G. Tanase ejected safely.
 #???, August 14, 1986 G.M. Stoica (not confirmed or incomplete info)
 #602, August 25, 1992 Both pilots, Maj. Dan C. Cosaceanu and Cpt. Traian G. Neagoe, ejected safely.
 #200, November 26, 1996 at Recea-Slatina. Crashed during a test flight. Cpt. Cmdr. Matei "Bebe" Constantin ejected safely.
 #210, July 9, 1997 at Craiova Air Base. Exploded on the runway during preparations for Romanian-made cluster munitions testing. 16 ground personnel died. The pilot, Cmdr. Ion Marculescu, hadn't yet approached the plane and was unharmed.
 #219, April 9, 1998 at Ghercesti, near Craiova. The forward landing gear could not be deployed after a test flight. Cmdr. Ion Marculescu ejected safely after exhausting the fuel and the airplane crashed a few km further. This was the last flight for the type.

Retirement

Following the outbreak of the war in Yugoslavia and the UN embargo, the IAR-93 program ended in Romania in 1992, with several airframes in different stages of construction. Around 75 aircraft were still in service, a few of them being used for testing and research (#200 – first B model with afterburners, #600 (DC) – the only one fitted with canards).

The last IAR-93s were withdrawn and mothballed from the Romanian Air Force in 1998. Surviving airframes are stored at Deveselu (IAR-93A #116), Timișoara (IAR-93MB #214), and Craiova (about 60 aircraft), not flight worthy (engines and other equipment removed) and most of them are up for sale. Apparently 20 of them were scrapped until 2006, with the rest awaiting the same fate in 2007.

The J-22 Orao are still in service with the air force of Serbia. The last Yugoslav aircraft was delivered in February 1992, and the plant in Mostar was destroyed shortly after.

Aircraft on display

 #002 (prototype DC) Aviation Museum, Bucharest (44°28'39.7"N 26°06'41.8"E)
 #109 (A) Henri Coandă School courtyard, Perișor, Dolj
 #112 (A) Aviation Museum, Bucharest (44°28'39.8"N 26°06'42.2"E)
 #114 (A) Aviation Museum, Bucharest (44°28'38.9"N 26°06'40.9"E)
 #153 (A) at the National Military Museum, Bucharest (44°26'25.3"N 26°04'36.4"E)
 #157 (A) donated by the Romanian Air Force to the Museum of Aviation in Košice, Slovakia on October 23, 2006
 #159 (A) in Bucharest, at the gate of I.N.C.A.S./Comoti Institut (the birthplace of IAR 93 and IAR 99) (44°26'03.5"N 26°00'21.3"E)
 #182 (A) Aviation Museum, Bucharest (44°28'38.5"N 26°06'39.7"E)
 #201 (MB) in Timișoara, on the road to Resita (45°43'8.27"N; 21°11'58.77"E)
 #205 (MB), #207, #208 (August 2022) in Orăștie, at Arsenal Park (45°50'02.7"N 23°09'52.7"E)
 #206 (MB) in Pivka Military History Park, Pivka, Slovenia
 #207 (MB) in Timișoara (45°44'4.65"N; 21°15'49.65"E)
 #208 (MB) Faur factory courtyard, Bucharest (44°25'38.7"N 26°10'49.3"E)
 #215 (MB) Colonești, Olt (44°38'01.3"N 24°40'41.2"E)
 #216 (MB) Bălăbănești, Galați (46°05'22.1"N 27°43'04.6"E)
 #223 (B) Gagu, Dascălu, (44°36'43.4"N 26°15'36.1"E)
 #229 (B) Vădeni, Brăila (45°21'46.572" N 27°56'22.716" E)
 #232 (B) in the Military Technical Academy's courtyard, Bucharest
 #600 (DC) in the Air Force Academy's courtyard, Brașov

Specifications (IAR-93B)

See also

References

External links 

National Institute for Aerospace Research "Elie Carafoli"
Photos of IAR-93 at Airliners.net
More photos at aeroflight.co.uk
Retired aircraft at 322 Aviation Maintenance Centre, Craiova
Movie at YouTube

93
1970s international attack aircraft
1970s Romanian attack aircraft
1970s Romanian military reconnaissance aircraft
1970s Romanian military trainer aircraft
Romania–Serbia relations
Twinjets
High-wing aircraft
Aircraft first flown in 1974
Romania–Yugoslavia relations